Caparo may refer to:

Business
Caparo plc, a British engineering company
Caparo Vehicle Technologies, a specialist British car maker
Caparo T1, a road-legal racing car
Caparo Industries plc v Dickman, a 1990 English court case

Geographical
Caparo River (Trinidad and Tobago)
Caparo River, a river in Venezuela
Santa María de Caparo, the shire town of Padre Noguera Municipality, Venezuela